The women's high jump at the 2022 European Athletics Championships took place at the Olympic Stadium on 19 & 21 August 2022.

Records

Schedule

Results
In the absence of Mariya Lasitskene, Yaroslava Mahuchikh of Ukraine was the overwhelming favourite, going into the Championships with her season's best of 2.03m. Iryna Herashchenko of Ukraine and bronze medallist of the 2022 World Athletics Championships, Italy's Elena Vallortigara were the only other competitors in the field who cleared 2.00m earlier in the season. In the final only two athletes cleared 1.95m, with Mahuchikh securing the win on countback and Montenegro's Marija Vuković finally winning her first major international medal with silver. 17-year-old Angelina Topić took bronze. The winning height of 1.95m was the lowest in Championships' history since 1974.

Qualification
Qualification: 1.94 m (Q) or best 12 performances (q).

Final

References

High jump W
High jump at the European Athletics Championships
Euro